"Hi-Lili, Hi-Lo" is a popular song with music by Bronislaw Kaper, and lyrics by Helen Deutsch. The song was published in 1952.  The song was featured in the 1953 film Lili, starring Leslie Caron.

Recorded versions

Dinah Shore with Frank De Vol's orchestra and chorus. Recorded in Hollywood on August 18, 1952. It was released by RCA Victor Records as catalog number 20-4992 (in USA) and by EMI on the HMV label as catalog number B 10385.
Shari Lewis (1952)
Eve Boswell (1953)
Leslie Caron and Mel Ferrer (1953)
Marilú in Spanish for Peerless Records (1953)
Perry Como, live on his TV show (1953)
:pt:Trio Madrigal  (written by :pt:Haroldo Barbosa (November 1953)
:pt:Neide Fraga  (December 1953)
Dick Hyman Trio (1956)
Roger Williams (1956)
Linda Lawson on the album Introducing Linda Lawson (1960)
The Everly Brothers (1961)
Chet Atkins (1961)
Shelley Fabares on the album Shelley! (1962)
The Four Seasons (1962)
Etta Jones on the album Love Shout (1962)
Slim Whitman (1963)
Nat King Cole (1963)
Johnny Mathis (1963)
Eydie Gorme
The Four Aces
Richard Chamberlain (1963, number 20 UK, number 64 U.S., number 18 U.S. AC)
Joni James
Sergio Franchi on the album Women in My Life (1964)
Teresa Brewer (1964)
Bobby Goldsboro (1964)
Ray Conniff  (1965)
The Lennon Sisters (1965)
Paul Desmond on the album Glad to be Unhappy (1965)
Paul Horn on the album Cycle (1965)
Manfred Mann on the album Mann Made (1965)
Alan Price Set, on the album The Price to Play The Alan Price Set (1966)
Shelby Flint (1966)
Gene Vincent (1967)
Jimmy Durante
Tim Buckley on the album Dream Letter: Live in London 1968 (1968)
Jim Nabors (1970)
Bill Evans on the album Intuition (1974)
John Farnham on the album Johnny Farnham Sings Hits from the Movies (1974)
Anne Murray on the album There's a Hippo in My Tub (1977)
Nalva Aguiar in Portuguese on the album Vala Pataedo
Dream Express (1979)
Gal Costa recorded  (1984)
Rickie Lee Jones on the album Pop Pop (1991)
Betty Buckley (1996)
John Slattery as Roger Sterling played an instrumental version on Mad Men season 7, episode 12 "Lost Horizon", aired on May 3, 2015.

References

1952 songs
1956 singles
1963 singles
1966 singles
Alan Price songs
Anne Murray songs
Gene Vincent songs
Manfred Mann songs
MGM Records singles
Richard Chamberlain songs
Shelley Fabares songs
Songs with lyrics by Helen Deutsch
Songs with music by Bronisław Kaper
The Everly Brothers songs